Mount Bruce is a summit in Yosemite National Park, United States.

Mount Bruce was named for the Bruce family of pioneer settlers.

References

Mountains of Madera County, California
Mountains of Northern California